William Crosbie, 1st Earl of Glandore (May 1716 – 11 April 1781), known as The Lord Brandon between 1762 and 1771 and as The Viscount Crosbie between 1771 and 1776, was an Irish politician.

Crosbie was the son of Maurice Crosbie, 1st Baron Brandon, by Lady Elizabeth Anne, daughter of Thomas FitzMaurice, 1st Earl of Kerry. He was elected at Trinity College Dublin.

He was returned to the Irish House of Commons for Ardfert in 1735, a seat he held until 1762, when he succeeded his father in the barony and entered the Irish House of Lords. In 1770 he was appointed Custos Rotulorum of Kerry. He was created Viscount Crosbie, of Ardfert in the County of Kerry, in 1771, and was further honoured when he was made Earl of Glandore, in the County of Cork, in 1776.

Marriages and succession
Lord Glandore was twice married. He married firstly Lady Theodosia, daughter of John Bligh, 1st Earl of Darnley and Theodosia Bligh, 10th Baroness Clifton, in 1745. They had two sons and three daughters. After her death in May 1777 he married secondly Jane, daughter of Edward Vesey and widow of John Ward, in 1777, six months after his first wife died. They had no issue. He died in April 1781 and was succeeded in the earldom by his only surviving son from his first marriage, John. The Countess of Glandore died in September 1787.

References

|-

1716 births
1781 deaths
People from County Kerry
William
Earls in the Peerage of Ireland
Members of the Irish House of Lords
Crosbie, William
Irish MPs 1727–1760
Irish MPs 1761–1768
Members of the Privy Council of Ireland
Alumni of Trinity College Dublin